Grzegorz Kosok (born 2 March 1986) is a Polish former professional volleyball player, a member of the Poland national team in 2011–2013, a participant at the Olympic Games London 2012, and the 2012 World League winner.

Personal life
He was born in Katowice, Poland. In 2014, he married Aleksandra. In June 2015, his wife gave birth to their daughter Amelia.

Career

Clubs
Kosok moved to Asseco Resovia in 2009. With the club from Rzeszów he achieved two gold (2012, 2013), silver (2014) and two bronze medals (2010, 2011) of the Polish Championship. He left Asseco Resovia after five years in May 2014.

National team
First time, he was appointed to the Polish national team by Andrea Anastasi in 2011. He won a bronze medal of the 2011 FIVB World League and the 2011 CEV European Championship. In November 2011 Poland won a silver medal of the 2011 FIVB World Cup and therefore qualified for the 2012 Olympic Games in London. He is a gold medalist of the 2012 FIVB World League in Sofia, Bulgaria. In 2015 he was called up to the team B of the Polish national team led by Andrzej Kowal. Kosok took part in the 1st edition of the 2015 European Games.

Honours

Clubs
 CEV Cup
  2011/2012 – with Asseco Resovia

 National championships
 2011/2012  Polish Championship, with Asseco Resovia
 2012/2013  Polish Championship, with Asseco Resovia
 2013/2014  Polish SuperCup, with Asseco Resovia
 2020/2021  Polish Championship, with Jastrzębski Węgiel

References

External links

 
 Player profile at PlusLiga.pl 
 Player profile at Volleybox.net

1986 births
Living people
Sportspeople from Katowice
Polish men's volleyball players
Olympic volleyball players of Poland
Volleyball players at the 2012 Summer Olympics
European Games competitors for Poland
Volleyball players at the 2015 European Games
Polish Champions of men's volleyball
Jadar Radom players
Resovia (volleyball) players
Jastrzębski Węgiel players
BKS Visła Bydgoszcz players
Middle blockers